Events in the year 1924 in Bulgaria.

Incumbents

Events 

 27 July – A Greek officer killed 17 Bulgarian peasants at Tarlis (present-day Vathytopos), a mountainous village in the Kato Nevrokopi region near the Greco-Bulgarian border.

References 

 
1920s in Bulgaria
Years of the 20th century in Bulgaria
Bulgaria
Bulgaria